Angelo Pietra (1550–1590) was an Italian Benedictine economist. He was a pioneer in accountancy and in particular the concept of financial accounting. He was born in Moneglia, and died in Montecassino.

Works

References 

16th-century economists
Italian economists
1550 births
1590 deaths
16th-century Genoese people